The Northern Territory Minister for Education is a Minister of the Crown in the Government of the Northern Territory. The minister administers their portfolio through the Department of Education.

The Minister is responsible for planning, development and administration of schools, vocational education and training in schools, teacher registration, the regulation of the teaching profession, early years education and care services and regulation, distance education, the approval and accreditation of higher education institutions and courses, grants for educational organisations, and student assistance schemes. They are also responsible for the Charles Darwin University and the Batchelor Institute of Indigenous Tertiary Education.

The current minister is Selena Uibo (Labor). She was appointed in a reshuffle in June 2018.

List of Ministers for Education

References

Northern Territory-related lists
Ministers of the Northern Territory government